Amenhotep was an ancient Egyptian prince during the 18th Dynasty, son and (possibly) the designated heir of Amenhotep II.

He was a priest of Ptah and is mentioned in an administrative papyrus (now in the British Museum). A stela near the Great Sphinx, showing a priest of Ptah whose name was erased, probably depicts him. It is likely that he died young, for the next pharaoh was his brother Thutmose IV.

Sources

Ancient Egyptian priests
Heirs to the ancient Egyptian throne
Princes of the Eighteenth Dynasty of Egypt
Children of Amenhotep II
Heirs apparent who never acceded